"Live in Athens" is a 7-inch single recorded at Sporting Athens Greece, 14 March 1988 touring for "Rock 'N' Roll'' album. It was released only in Greece 20 May 1988 in a strictly numbered limited edition of 100 copies.

"Live in Athens" is a single by the British heavy metal band Motörhead. FM Records release it under the permission of Lemmy and Roardrunner GWM in 7-inch single, only in Greece as a strictly limited edition of 100 copies. The single re-released after several years as a CD single free sample with a magazine.

Single track listing 
"Metropolis" written by Lemmy, Fast Eddie Clarke, and Phil Taylor.
"Orgasmatron" written by Lemmy, Pete Gill, and Phil Campell.

7-inch single 
 "Metropolis (Acropolis)" – 3:37
 "Orgasmatron" – 5:35

Personnel 
 Lemmybass guitar, lead vocals
 Phil "Wizzö" Campbellguitar
 Michael "Würzel" Burstonguitar 
 Phil "Philthy Animal" Taylor drums

References 

=

Motörhead songs
1987 singles
1990 singles
Songs written by Phil Taylor (musician)
Songs written by Lemmy
Songs written by Würzel
Songs written by Phil Campbell (musician)
1988 songs
Epic Records singles